The 1990 California lieutenant gubernatorial election was held on November 6, 1990. Incumbent Democrat Leo T. McCarthy defeated Republican nominee Marian Bergeson with 51.29% of the vote.

Primary elections
Primary elections were held on June 5, 1990.

Democratic primary

Candidates
Leo T. McCarthy, incumbent Lieutenant Governor

Results

Republican primary

Candidates
Marian Bergeson, State Senator
John Seymour, State Senator

Results

General election

Candidates
Major party candidates
Leo T. McCarthy, Democratic
Marian Bergeson, Republican

Other candidates
Anthony Bajada, Libertarian
Clyde Kuhn, Peace and Freedom
Merton D. Short, American Independent

Results

References

1990
California
Gubernatorial